Dvora Bochman (born 1950) is an Israeli artist, painter, sculptor, graphic designer and art educator.

Biography
Dvora Bochman was born in 1950 as Dvora Rivka Zemel, to Shoshana Zemel and Arye Zemel. Bochman completed her art and education studies at Hamidrasha College for Arts in 1972. In 1972 she married Zvi Bochman and moved to Givatayim.

Art career
In 1984, Bochman relocated to Nairobi, Kenya. During this time, she was involved in the local arts. She volunteered as a docent at the National Museum of Kenya where she attended training courses at the National Museums of Kenya in 1982. She assisted local theatrical companies by painting theatrical backgrounds for play and ballet productions, which included the Hurlington Players production of the Canterbury Tales, the National Theatre, and the Nairobi Ballet. She also took on commercial engagements including work for the Kenyan Postal Authority and murals. In the 1990s, Bochman was involved in producing stamps and other philatelic materials for post offices in Kenya and Israel. She also created some large scale compositions.

In 1992, Bochman returned to Israel and resumed her university education. She continued her artistic activities, accepting commercial commissions from the Israeli and Kenyan postal authorities as well as participating in art exhibitions.

In 2003 Bochman relocated to Budapest, Hungary. She volunteered as a docent in the Budapest Museum of Fine Arts and made several exhibitions. She joined many programs of the Museum of Fine Arts, where she was active as an art information scientist, setting up the digital library and instructing on better presentation skills.

As of 2012, she is a member of Israel Miniature Art Society (IMAS) and painters and sculptors association Givatayim Ramat-Gan.

Works and criticism
Bochman has worked with oil paints and acrylics on canvas and plywood. More recent works include mixed media on a papier-mâché foundation, embedding of small objects and often featuring multi-chromatic glazing.

One of the notable works by Bochman was painted on a wooden wall and commissioned by Vamos & Partners Architects for the UNEP Headquarters in Nairobi. Another mural was a more abstract composition called Maasai Necklaces at the entrance of the Ya-Ya Centre in Nairobi.

Scholarships
 1968: a citation from the Department of Education Municipality Tel Aviv in jewelry design
 1971: a score respect and scholarship from Sharet Foundation for young artists in Tel Aviv
 1997: a scholarship from Beit-Berl for her B.A. studies in computer science

Philatelic materials

Philatelic materials produced for 1991-3 are included in the permanent collection of the Alexander Museum of Postal History and Philately, and near the entrance to the Eretz Israel Museum.

Solo exhibitions
 1979 Beit Sokolov (House of journalists) — Tel Aviv, Israel
 1980 Beit-Emmanuel — Ramat-Gan, Israel
 1984 French Cultural Center — Nairobi, Kenya 
 1985 Goethe Cultural Institute — Nairobi, Kenya – Fantastic  Realism
 2009 MadeByYou — Budapest, Hungary
 2009 Rumbach Old Synagogue — Creation – in the 2012 Summer Festival Of Tolerance – Budapest, Hungary
 2010 Bible House Museum — Tel Aviv, Israel

Selected group exhibitions
 2009 Biennale Venice – ScalaMata Gallery — Venice, Italy

Exhibitions as curator
 2012 CCA — Tel Aviv, Israel – “Mágia(r) kocka” – Hungarian Magic Cube – video exhibition of Hungarian artists

See also
 Eretz Israel Museum
 Israel Museum
 Museum of Fine Arts (Budapest)
 National Museum of Kenya

References

External links

 
 

Bar-Ilan University alumni
Israeli sculptors
Israeli women sculptors
Bochman
Bochman
1950 births
Living people